Ancien Camp is an abri or infantry shelter associated with the Maginot Line's Alpine extension, the Alpine Line.  The position consists of two entry blocks. Neither block was armed. One machine gun cloche and embrasures for a heavy twin machine gun and a light machine gun were built, but not equipped. The blocks are connected by a single large underground gallery.

See also 
 List of Alpine Line ouvrages

References

Bibliography 
Allcorn, William. The Maginot Line 1928-45. Oxford: Osprey Publishing, 2003. 
Kauffmann, J.E. and Kaufmann, H.W. Fortress France: The Maginot Line and French Defenses in World War II, 2006. 
Mary, Jean-Yves; Hohnadel, Alain; Sicard, Jacques. Hommes et Ouvrages de la Ligne Maginot, Tome 4 - La fortification alpine. Paris, Histoire & Collections, 2009.  
Mary, Jean-Yves; Hohnadel, Alain; Sicard, Jacques. Hommes et Ouvrages de la Ligne Maginot, Tome 5. Paris, Histoire & Collections, 2009.

External links 
 Ancien Camp (petit ouvrage de l') at fortiff.be 

ANCI
Maginot Line
Alpine Line